Allocosa dufouri is a wolf spider (family Lycosidae) found in Portugal and Spain.

See also 
 List of Lycosidae species

References

External links 

Lycosidae
Spiders of Europe
Spiders described in 1876